Hellmut Lange (19 January 1923 - 13 January 2011) was an actor and journalist who became famous as an action hero on TV and eventually succeeded as presenter on popular TV show Kennen Sie Kino? or  Do You Know Film?

Acting career
Hellmut Lange started his acting career on radio drama shows for the West German Radio Station Sender Freies Berlin also known as Radio Free Berlin. After finishing his schooling he studied acting for two years in Hanover and then he worked as a stage actor in Munich. In the early fifties he played Old Shatterhand on an open air stage.

After starring in several made for television films, in he was the principal actor in The Forger of London a German Edgar Wallace adaption for cinema. The next year he had one of the main roles in a TV mini series based on a story by Francis Durbridge.  He also acted as the secret agent protagonist the TV series John Kling.

He played Natty Bumppo in a European miniseries based on James Fenimore Cooper's Leatherstocking Tales.  Later he appeared in Patton (1969).

He was the German voice for Richard Harris, Charlton Heston,  Paul Newman and other American stars for the German dubbed versions of their feature films.

Lederstrumpf and John Kling's Abenteuer had just been digitally remastered and released on DVD.

Career as a journalist
Due to his accomplished expertise in regards to all aspects in acting and filming Lange, was also much in demand as an author for articles about the cinema. German television took advantage of this well known fact by employing him as presenter on a quiz programme Kennen Sie Kino? which ran from 1971 till 1981.

Retirement 
Lange worked successfully as an actor on TV until he was over seventy years old. In 2009 it was published that serious health issues would hinder him continuing.

Selected filmography

Film
Lebensborn (1961), as Oberscharführer Nietermann
The Forger of London (1961), as Peter Clifton
 (1962), as Harald Birk
 (1963), as Leutnant Junkermann
Murder in Rio (1963), as Peter Jordan
A Man in His Prime (1964), as Ferrow
Serenade for Two Spies (1965), as John Krim
4 Schlüssel (1966), as Thilo
 (1966), as Harry Miller
 (1966), as Claus van Dongen
Diamond Safari (1966), as Robert Alphène
 (1967), as Ernst
The Blonde from Peking (1967), as Malik
Love Nights in the Taiga (1967), as Captain Jimmy Braddock
Patton (1970), as Major Dorian von Haarenwege (uncredited)
 (1975), as Untersuchungsrichter
 (1977), as Gordon Hamilton
Hitler: A Film from Germany (1977), as Hitlers Kammerdiener / Goebbels-Puppenspieler / SS-Mann
Miko: From the Gutter to the Stars (1986), as Television presenter

Television
Der Tod des Sokrates (1957), as Kriton
Stahlnetz:  (1958, TV series episode), as Kriminalkommissar Mattern
Johnny Belinda (1961, based on Johnny Belinda), as Dr. Jack Roberts
 (1961), as Harry Clayton
 (1962, TV miniseries), as Edward Collins
 (1962, based on Laura), as Mark McPherson
Der Belagerungszustand (1963, based on The State of Siege), as Diego
: Das gelbe Paket (1963, TV series episode), as Ted Richter
Stahlnetz:  (1964, TV series episode), as Gustav Streuner
John Kling (1965–1970, TV series), as John Kling
Die Ermittlung (1966, based on The Investigation), as Stark
Stahlnetz:  (1966, TV series episode), as Kriminalhauptkommissar Helmut Meyer
Treasure Island (1966, TV miniseries), as Narrator (voice)
Heydrich in Prag (1967), as Jindra
Sieben Wochen auf dem Eis (1967), as Baldizzone
König Richard II (1968, based on Richard II), as Northumberland
Von Mäusen und Menschen (1968, based on Of Mice and Men), as Slim
 (1968–1984, TV game show)
The Last of the Mohicans (1969, TV miniseries), as Natty Bumppo
Salto Mortale (1969–1972, TV series, 14 episodes), as Mischa
Der Kommissar: Blinde Spiele (1972, TV series episode), as Dr. Gerd Kerrut
Eurogang (1975–1976, TV series, 6 episodes), as Hauptkommissar Karl Hager
The Old Fox: Nachtmusik (1978, TV series episode), as Gregor Kerner
Tatort: Der Schläfer (1983, TV series episode), as Wellmann
Mandara (1983, TV miniseries), as Pastor Petersen
Rivalen der Rennbahn (1989, TV series, 11 episodes), as Wolf Kremer
 (1996, TV film), as Herwegh

German-language Dubbing
Richard Harris (Zachary Bass), in Man in the Wilderness (1971)
James Coburn (Jim McCabe), in Sky Riders (1976)
Charlton Heston (Captain Matthew Garth), in Midway (1976)
Donald Sutherland (Frank Lansing), in Bear Island (1979)
Roy Scheider (Officer Frank Murphy), in Blue Thunder (1983)
Paul Newman (Walter Bridge), in Mr. and Mrs. Bridge (1990)

References 
 Filmography
 Biography and Interview
 Obituary in Süddeutsche Zeitung 
 Obituary in Der Spiegel

External links
 

1923 births
2011 deaths
German male film actors
German male television actors
20th-century German male actors